Avenida Marginal may refer to several avenues:

Avenida Marginal (Mindelo), an avenue in Mindelo, Cape Verde
the former name of Avenida Combatentes da Liberdade da Patria, in Praia, Cape Verde
Avenida Marginal, an album by Bana, named after the avenue in Mindelo